The 1914 Yale Bulldogs football team represented Yale University in the 1914 college football season. The Bulldogs finished with a 7–2 record under first-year head coach Frank Hinkey.

Fullback Harry LeGore was a consensus All-American, and tackle Bud Talbot also received   honors from multiple selectors.

The Yale Bowl opened on November 21; the inaugural game was against rival Harvard, a 36–0 loss with a crowd of between 68,000 and 71,000 in attendance.

Schedule

References

Yale
Yale Bulldogs football seasons
Yale Bulldogs football